Liberal High School is a public high school (spanning grades 9–12) that is located in Liberal, Kansas, United States. It is operated by Liberal USD 480 school district. The school colors are red and black. The enrollment for the 2016–2017 school year was approximately 1,318 students. Liberal High School is a member of the Kansas State High School Activities Association and offers a variety of sports programs. Athletic teams compete in the 6A division and are known as the "Redskins". Extracurricular activities are also offered in the form of performing arts, school publications, and clubs.

Extracurricular activities
The Redskins compete in the Western Athletic Conference and are classified as a 6A school, the largest classification in Kansas according to the Kansas State High School Activities Association. Liberal has won 34 state championships in various sports.

Athletics
Many sports are offered at Liberal High School. The boys' track and field program set a state record of 14 consecutive state titles between 1991 and 2004. The girls' track and field program won 12 state titles, including 8 in a row between 1994 and 2001.

State championships

Liberal High School offers the following sports:

Fall
Football
Volleyball
Boys Cross-Country
Girls Cross-Country
Girls Golf
Boys Soccer
Girls Tennis
Dance Team
Cheerleading

Winter
Boys Swim
Boys Basketball
Girls Basketball
Wrestling
Boys Bowling
Girls Bowling
Dance Team
Winter Cheerleading

Spring
Baseball
Boys Golf
Boys Tennis
Girls Soccer
Girls Swimming/Diving
Softball
Boys Track and Field
Girls Track and Field

Notable alumni

Lamar Chapman, former NFL and CFL player
Kelli McCarty, Miss USA 1991
Jerrod Niemann, country musician
Melvin Sanders, former NBA player for the San Antonio Spurs
William Stafford, poet, appointed as the 20th Consultant in Poetry to the Library of Congress, awarded the National Book Award for Poetry, Guggenheim Fellowship, Western States Book Award, Robert Frost Medal
Doug Terry, former NFL player for the Kansas City Chiefs
Jerame Tuman, former NFL player for the Pittsburgh Steelers and Arizona Cardinals
Larry Welch, retired General and 12th Chief of Staff of the United States Air Force

See also
 List of high schools in Kansas
 List of unified school districts in Kansas

References

External links
Official school website
School district
USD 480 School District Boundary Map, KDOT

Public high schools in Kansas
Schools in Seward County, Kansas
1982 establishments in Kansas